Victor (Vic) Browne (born 10 January 1942) is a former Australian cyclist. He competed in the team pursuit at the 1964 Summer Olympics. He won the Austral Wheel Race in 1967.

References

1942 births
Living people
Australian male cyclists
Olympic cyclists of Australia
Place of birth missing (living people)
Cyclists at the 1964 Summer Olympics
Australian track cyclists